Human Rights in Islam is a 1976 book written by Sayyid Abul Ala Maududi, the founder of Jamaat-e-Islami.

In the book, Maududi argues that respect for human rights has always been enshrined in Sharia law (that the roots of these rights are to be found in Islamic doctrine) and criticises Western notions that there is an inherent contradiction between the two.

See also
 Human rights in Islamic countries
 Pact of Umar
 Cairo Declaration on Human Rights in Islam

References 

1976 non-fiction books
Books by Sayyid Abul Ala Maududi
Human rights in Islam